Yves Deniaud (born 1 September 1946 in Casablanca) is a French politician, a member of the National Assembly.   He represents the Orne department, and is a member of the Union for a Popular Movement.

References

1946 births
Living people
People from Casablanca
Politicians from Normandy
Rally for the Republic politicians
Union for a Popular Movement politicians
Deputies of the 10th National Assembly of the French Fifth Republic
Deputies of the 11th National Assembly of the French Fifth Republic
Deputies of the 12th National Assembly of the French Fifth Republic
Deputies of the 13th National Assembly of the French Fifth Republic
Chevaliers of the Légion d'honneur
Members of Parliament for Orne